This is the list of cathedrals in Grenada sorted by denomination.

Roman Catholic 
Cathedrals of the Roman Catholic Church in Grenada:

Cathedral of the Immaculate Conception, St. George's

See also
Lists of cathedrals

References

Cathedrals
Grenada
Cathedrals